The 1851 Alabama gubernatorial election took place on August 4, 1851, in order to elect the governor of Alabama. Democrat Henry W. Collier won his second term with a big majority of the votes.

Candidates

Democratic Party
Henry W. Collier, incumbent
William Lowndes Yancey, representative of Alabama's 3rd congressional district from 1844 to 1846.
Nathaniel Terry, narrowly lost in the 1845 election.

Whig Party
James Shields

Election

References

Alabama gubernatorial elections
1851 Alabama elections
Alabama
August 1851 events